Moshe Pearlman (1911 – 5 April 1986), born Maurice Pearlman, was an Israeli writer.

Biography 

He was born in England and his original name was Morris Perlman. His father was born in Minsk, his mother was born in England by an immigrant family who came from Poland.

He studied at the London School of Economics and was a student of Harold Laski.

He first worked as a journalist and emigrated to Israel. He joined the Army of the newly founded state. From 1948 to 1952 he was the first Israeli military spokesman. In 1960 he retired and devoted himself to literary activity.

See also 
 IDF Spokesperson's Unit

Books 
 What has been happening in Palestine, 1937
 The kvutza: a description of the collective settlement in Palestine (with Shalom Wurm), 1943
 The army of Israel, 1950
 The Capture Of Adolf Eichmann, 1961
 The capture and trial of Adolf Eichmann, 1963
 Historical sites in Israel, 1965
 The Zealots of Masada, 1967
 Jerusalem; a history of forty centuries (with Teddy Kollek), 1968
 In the footsteps of Moses, 1973
 The Maccabees, 1973
 Digging up the Bible: the stories behind the great archaeological discoveries in the Holy Land, 1980

1911 births
1986 deaths
Alumni of the London School of Economics
British emigrants to Israel
Israel Defense Forces spokespersons
20th-century Israeli Jews